Triple Rock is a brewpub in Berkeley, California.

History
The company brewed their first batch of beer on Christmas day 1985, and opened to the public the following year. They claim to be the fifth brewpub opened in the United States, and the oldest currently in operation with the original equipment and brewmasters. The brewery was founded as Roaring Rock Brewery and Alehouse, but changed their name in 1989 at the insistence of Latrobe Brewing Company, owners of Rolling Rock brand beer.

In 2008, the owners of Triple Rock purchased Drake's Brewing Company, in San Leandro, California.

Awards

See also 
 List of breweries in California

References 

Drinking establishments in the San Francisco Bay Area
Beer brewing companies based in the San Francisco Bay Area
Companies based in Berkeley, California
1985 establishments in California
Restaurants in the San Francisco Bay Area